The following is a list of notable deaths in September 2007.

Entries for each day are listed alphabetically by surname. A typical entry lists information in the following sequence:
 Name, age, country of citizenship at birth, subsequent country of citizenship (if applicable), reason for notability, cause of death (if known), and reference.

September 2007

1
Robert H. Ahmanson, 80, American businessman and philanthropist, heart attack.
Tomás Medina Caracas, 42, Colombian guerrilla member of FARC, military action.
Russell Ellington, 69, American basketball coach for the Harlem Globetrotters, lung cancer.
Sir Abraham Goldberg, 83, Scottish doctor and medical scientist.
Sally Haley, 99, American painter, natural causes.
Sir Roy McKenzie, 84, New Zealand philanthropist, harness racing breeder, trainer and competitor.
Viliam Schrojf, 76, Slovakian former football goalkeeper.
John T. Scott, 67, black person sculptor and artist.

2
Rajae Belmlih, 45, Moroccan singer, cancer.
Anthony Day, 74, American editorial page editor for the Los Angeles Times, emphysema.
Robert Fidgeon, 65, Australian television columnist and critic, cancer.
Safet Isović, 71, Bosnian singer.
Marcia Mae Jones, 83, American actress (Heidi, These Three).
Max McNab, 83, Canadian ice hockey player, coach, and NHL general manager.
Pat Norton, 88, Australian Olympic backstroke swimmer.
Bill Robinson, 88, Australian rules footballer.

3
Carter Albrecht, 34, American keyboardist and guitarist (Edie Brickell & New Bohemians), shot.
Clarke Bynum, 45, American basketball player (Clemson Tigers), 2000 hijack hero, cancer.
Gustavo Eberto, 24, Argentine footballer (Boca Juniors), testicular cancer.
Sir Hamish Forbes, 91, British soldier and aristocrat.
Steve Fossett, 63, American adventurer, aircrash.
Syd Jackson, 68, New Zealand Māori rights activist, cancer.
Gift Leremi, 22, South African international footballer, car accident.
Don Maloney, 79, American writer, author on Japan.
Janis Martin, 67, American singer, cancer.
Lord Michael Pratt, 61, British writer and aristocrat.
Steve Ryan, 60, American actor (The West Wing, American Dreams, Daddio).
Mária Szepes, 98, Hungarian writer.
Jane Tomlinson, 43, British cancer activist, cancer.

4
Michael Evans, 87, American actor.
Bhamidipati Radhakrishna, 77, Indian playwright and scriptwriter.
Kumari Rukmini, 78, Indian actress and dancer.
Gigi Sabani, 54, Italian television host, heart attack.
John Scott, 9th Duke of Buccleuch, 83, British politician and aristocrat.
Ryūzō Sejima, 95, Japanese academic, chairman of the board of Asia University, World War II strategist.
Seth Tobias, 44, American television commentator, financial commentator for CNBC's Squawk Box.

5
Julieta Campos, 75, Cuban-Mexican writer, cancer.
*Duan Yihe, 61, Chinese congress member who arranged the murder of his mistress, execution.
Jennifer Dunn, 66, American Representative from Washington (1993–2005), pulmonary embolism.
Paul Gillmor, 68, American Representative from Ohio since 1989.
Edward Gramlich, 68, American economics professor, governor of the Federal Reserve System, lymphocytic leukemia.
Charlotte Zucker, 86, American actress.
Thomas Hansen, 31, Norwegian musician known as "Saint Thomas", combination of prescribed drugs.
D. James Kennedy, 76, American evangelical Protestant pastor and theologian, founder of Coral Ridge Ministries.
Nikos Nikolaidis, 67, Greek film director, pulmonary edema.

6
Martin Čech, 31, Czech international ice hockey player, car accident.
Eva Crane, 95, British bee expert.
Allan Crite, 97, American artist, natural causes.
Billy Darnell, 81, American professional wrestler of the 1940s–1960s famous for feuds with Buddy Rogers.
Wolfgang Franke, 95, German sinologist.
Evald Gering, 89, Canadian Olympic shooter.
Ian Gray, 69, British comics writer.
Jack Hawkes, 92, British botanist.
John Kelly, 71, Provisional Irish Republican Army founder-member and Northern Ireland Assembly member (1998–2003), cancer.
Madeleine L'Engle, 88, American writer (A Wrinkle in Time), natural causes.
Lee Ae-jung, 20, South Korean actress, complications of brain cancer.
Ronald Magill, 87, British actor (Amos Brearly on Emmerdale Farm).
Bill Muller, 42, American film critic and journalist.
Luciano Pavarotti, 71, Italian operatic tenor, pancreatic cancer.
Percy Rodriguez, 89, Canadian character actor and movie trailer narrator, kidney problems.
Byron Stevenson, 50, British footballer (Wales, Leeds United, Birmingham City), throat cancer.

7
Alex, 31, American-born African grey parrot, subject of animal language experiments.
Sir John Compton, 82, St. Lucian Prime Minister (1979, 1982–1996, 2006–2007), stroke.
Norman Deeley, 73, British footballer (Wolverhampton Wanderers).
Russell E. Dougherty, 87, American former commander in chief of the Strategic Air Command.
Joseph W. Eschbach, 74, American doctor and kidney specialist whose research led to treatment of anemia, cancer.
Joseph Rudolph Grimes, 84, Liberian foreign minister (1960–1972).
Sidney Leviss, 90, American politician and judge.
Gabriel Baccus Matthews, 59, Liberian foreign minister (1980–1981, 1990–1993).
Mark Weil, 55, Uzbek theatre director, stabbed.

8
Lord Bethell, 69, British historian of Eastern and Central Europe, human rights campaigner, Parkinson's disease.
Jean-François Bizot, 63, French journalist, creator of "Actuel", Radio Nova, cancer.
Adrian Esquino Lisco, 68, Salvadoran indigenous rights activist and spiritual chief, complications from diabetes.
Vincent Serventy, 91, Australian writer and conservationist.

9
Hannes Brewis, 87, South African rugby union player.
Angie Brooks, 78, Liberian diplomat and jurist.
Ian Campbell, 81, British politician, MP for Dunbartonshire West (1970–1983) and Dumbarton (1983–1987).
 Han Dingxiang, 71, Chinese Roman Catholic prelate, detained for loyalty to the Vatican.
ASHK Sadek, 73, Bangladeshi politician.
Helmut Senekowitsch, 73, Austrian football player and manager.
Zoran Tadić, 66, Croatian film director.
Hughie Thomasson, 55, American guitarist (Outlaws), heart attack.
Sir Tasker Watkins VC, 88, British jurist and businessman, Lord Justice of Appeal and former WRU President, after short illness.
*Xu Simin, 93, Hong Kong magazine publisher, pro-Beijing supporter, organ failure.

10
Loretta King Hadler, 90, American film actress, natural causes.
James Leasor, 83, British novelist and biographer.
Joe Rantz, 93, American rower who competed in the 1936 Summer Olympics.
Dame Anita Roddick, 64, British entrepreneur and founder of The Body Shop, brain haemorrhage.
Arthur Ross, 96, American businessman and philanthropist known for his contribution to Central Park.
Joe Sherlock, 76, Irish Teachta Dála for Cork East (1981–1982, 1987–1992, 2002–2007).
Ted Stepien, 82, American businessman and former owner of the Cleveland Cavaliers basketball team.
Enrique Torres, 85, American professional wrestler.
Jane Wyman, 90, American Academy Award-winning actress (Johnny Belinda), 1984 Golden Globe winner (Falcon Crest), first wife of Ronald Reagan.

11
John Garrett, 76, British politician, MP for Norwich South 1974–1983 and 1987–1997.
Ian Porterfield, 61, British footballer and manager (scored Sunderland's 1973 FA Cup winner), colon cancer.
Gene Savoy, 80, American explorer and religious mystic, claimed discovery of over 40 lost cities in Peru, natural causes.
James F. Smith, 84, American politician.
Willie Tee, 63, American singer-songwriter and producer, colon cancer.
Joe Zawinul, 75, Austrian jazz keyboardist and composer, founder of Weather Report, cancer.

12
Bobby Byrd, 73, American soul/funk singer, cancer.
Daryl Holton, 45, American convicted murderer, first man executed by electric chair in Tennessee in 47 years.

13
Abdul Sattar Abu Risha, 37, Iraqi leader of Anbar Salvation Council, improvised explosive device.
Gaetano Arfé, 81, Italian politician.
Robert Bates, 96, American mountaineer.
Laurel Burch, 61, American artist, osteopetrosis.
Phil Frank, 64, American cartoonist, brain tumor.
Bill Griffiths, 59, British poet and Anglo-Saxon scholar.
Augie Hiebert, 90, American who built Alaska's first television station (KTVA), cancer.
Neville Jeffress, 87, Australian founder of Media Monitors Australia, pneumonia.
Colin Mitchell, 78, English cricketer.
Clare Oliver, 26, Australian cancer activist, melanoma.
Abdul Sattar Buzaigh al-Rishawi, 35, Iraqi leader of the Anbar Salvation Council, bomb.
Whakahuihui Vercoe, 79, New Zealand retired Anglican archbishop.

14
Sir Robert Honeycombe, 86, British metallurgist.
Jacques Martin, 74, French presenter and former husband of Cécilia Sarkozy, cancer.
Emilio Ruiz del Rio, 84, Spanish set decorator (Pan's Labyrinth), respiratory failure.
Benny Vansteelant, 30, Belgian world champion duathlete, bike accident.

15
Leslie Holligan, 29, Guyanese footballer, heart failure.
Colin McRae, 39, British World Rally champion, helicopter crash.
Sir Jeremy Moore, 79, British soldier, commander of UK land forces in the Falklands War.
Specs Powell, 85, American jazz drummer, kidney disease.
Ernie Renzel, 100, American politician, Mayor of San Jose (1945–1946), "Father of San Jose International Airport."
Aldemaro Romero, 79, Venezuelan composer, pianist and conductor, complications of intestinal blockage.
Brett Somers, 83, American actress, comedian and panelist (Match Game), stomach and colon cancer.

16
Jean Balissat, 71, Swiss musician.
Peter Cleeland, 69, Australian politician, MHR for McEwen (1984–1990, 1993–1996), motor neurone disease.
Robert Jordan, 58, American fantasy novelist (The Wheel of Time), cardiac amyloidosis.
Cal Rampton, 93, American politician, Governor of Utah (1965–1977), cancer.
Garrard "Buster" Ramsey, 87, American football player and coach, pneumonia.

17
Jim Furner, 79, Australian military intelligence chief.
Stephen Medcalf, 70, British scholar.
Rappani Khalilov, 37, Chechen militant, leader of the Shariat Jamaat, terrorist, killed by Russian troops.

18
Augustus Akinloye, 91, Nigerian politician, founder of the Ibadan Peoples Party.
Benyamin Yosef Bria, 51, Indonesian Roman Catholic prelate, Bishop of Denpasar.
Norman Gaylord, 84, American chemist, developed permeable contact lens.
Nate Hill, 41, American football player (Green Bay Packers, Miami Dolphins, Washington Redskins).
Pepsi Tate, 42, British bassist (Tigertailz), pancreatic cancer.
Len Thompson, 60, Australian footballer (1965–1980), heart attack.

19
Bassem Hamad al-Dawiri, 34, Iraqi sculptor, replaced Saddam Hussein statue toppled during 2003 invasion of Iraq, car accident.
Antoine Ghanem, 64, Lebanese politician, MP, car bomb.
Mike Osborne, 66, British jazz musician.
Vlatko Pavletić, 76, Croatian politician, Speaker of Parliament (1995–1999), acting President (1999–2000).
H. Emory Widener, Jr., 83, American jurist (United States Court of Appeals for the Fourth Circuit), lung cancer.

20
Mahlon Clark, 84, American clarinetist, natural causes.
Helen Elaine Freeman, 75, American endangered species (snow leopards) advocate, lung disease.
Johnny Gavin, 79, Irish international footballer and Norwich City's record goalscorer.
Kaljo Kiisk, 81, Estonian actor, film director and politician.
Viktor Shershunov, 56, Russian governor of Kostroma Oblast, car accident.
Labah Sosseh, 64, Senegalese singer.
Sir Edward Tomkins, 91, British diplomat, ambassador to The Netherlands and France.

21
Hallgeir Brenden, 78, Norwegian cross country skier, gold medallist (1952 and 1956 Winter Olympics).
Bob Collins, 61, Australian ALP senator (1987–1998) and minister (1990–1996), suicide by alcohol and drug overdose.
Alice Ghostley, 84, American actress (Designing Women, To Kill a Mockingbird, Grease), Tony winner (1965), colon cancer.
Ian Gilmour, Baron Gilmour of Craigmillar, 81, British politician.
Rex Humbard, 88, American televangelist, congestive heart failure.
Paul Konsler, 94, French Olympic shooter.
Floria Lasky, 84, American entertainment attorney and litigator, cancer.
Ángel Romero, 75, Mexican Olympic cyclist.
Petar Stambolić, 95, Serbian Prime Minister of the Socialist Republic of Serbia (1978–1982), President of Yugoslavia (1982–1983).
Coral Watts, 53, American serial killer, complications of prostate cancer.
Wu Xiangxiang, 92, Chinese historian.

22
Albert Fuller, 81, American harpsichordist and founder of the Aston Magna Foundation and Festival.
Herbert Gallen, 92, American chairman and owner of Ellen Tracy sportswear.
Karl Hardman, 80, American horror film producer and actor.
Richard Hornby, 85, British politician and businessman.
Marcel Marceau, 84, French mime artist.
William D. Rogers, 80, American advisor to Henry Kissinger, heart attack.
ʻAlí-Muhammad Varqá, 95, Iranian-born leader in the Baháʼí Faith.

23
Renzo Barbieri, 67, Italian writer.
Ken Danby, 67, Canadian painter.
Ivan Hinderaker, 91, American academic, chancellor of the University of California, Riverside (1964–1979).

24
Geoff Cannell, 65, Manx Member of the House of Keys and sports broadcaster, stroke.
Terry Connolly, 49, Australian judge of the ACT Supreme Court, heart attack.
Kurt Julius Goldstein, 92, German journalist and Auschwitz survivor.
André Gorz, 84, Austrian-born French social philosopher, suicide.
Frank Hyde, 91, Australian rugby league player and commentator.
Hiroshi Ōsaka, 44, Japanese co-founder of Bones Animation Studio, cancer.
Wolfgang K. H. Panofsky, 88, American physicist and former director of SLAC, heart attack.
Frank Sherring, 93, Canadian politician, Mayor of Lethbridge, Alberta (1962–1968), cancer.
Otto Spacek, 89, Czech World War II hero.
Lenore Tawney, 100, American fiber artist.

25
Haidar Abdel-Shafi, 88, Palestinian negotiator, stomach cancer.
Patrick Bourque, 29, Canadian bass guitarist (Emerson Drive), suicide.
Hans Colberg, 95, Danish footballer.
André Emmerich, 82, German-born American art dealer, complications from a stroke.
Jana Krishnamurthi, 79, Indian politician, President of the Bharatiya Janata Party (2001–2007).
Michael Wayne Richard, 48, American murderer, execution by lethal injection.
Bill Waller, 95, American college football coach.

26
Stanislav Andreski, 88, Polish sociologist.
Robert Bruss, 67, American real estate attorney and columnist, cancer.
Velma Wayne Dawson, 94, American creator of the Howdy Doody puppet.
Angela Lambert, 67, British journalist, historian and novelist.
Erik Hazelhoff Roelfzema, 90, Dutch secret agent, author and businessman.
Randy Van Horne, 83, American singer of TV theme songs (The Flintstones, The Jetsons), cancer.
Bill Wirtz, 77, American owner of the NHL's Chicago Blackhawks, cancer.

27
Nenad Bogdanović, 53, Serbian politician, mayor of Belgrade (2004–2007), lymphoma.
Dale Houston, 67, American musician (Dale and Grace).
Kenji Nagai, 50, Japanese video journalist, shot.
Bill Perry, 77, South African-born English footballer, cancer.
Marjatta Raita, 63, Finnish actress, cancer.
George Rieveschl, 91, American inventor (Benadryl), pneumonia.
Israel Segal, 63, Israeli writer and journalist, heart failure.
Avraham Shapira, 93, Israeli rabbi, Ashkenazi chief rabbi of Israel (1983–1993).

28
René Desmaison, 77, French mountaineer.
Charles B. Griffith, 77, American screenwriter.
Evelyn Knight, 89, American singer, lung cancer.
Adam Kozłowiecki, 96, Polish-born Roman Catholic prelate, Archbishop of Lusaka (1955–1969).
Peter Kuiper, 78, Dutch-born German actor.
Martin Manulis, 92, American television and film producer, Emmy Award winner.
Wally Parks, 94, American drag racing and hot rod pioneer, pneumonia.
Derek Shackleton, 83, British cricketer (Hampshire and England).
Hamid Shirzadeghan, 66, Iranian footballer, lung cancer.

29
Lois Maxwell, 80, Canadian actress (Dr. No, Goldfinger, A View to a Kill), colorectal cancer.
Katsuko Saruhashi, 87, Japanese scientist, pneumonia.
Gyula Zsivótzky, 70, Hungarian hammer thrower, 1968 Olympics gold medallist, cancer.

30
Al Chang, 85, American two-time Pulitzer prize-nominated military photographer, leukemia.
John Henebry, 89, American Air Force major general, heart failure.
Milan Jelić, 51, Bosnian politician, president of Republika Srpska entity (2006–2007), heart attack.
Joe Mitty, 88, British founder of the Oxfam charity shop.
C. F. D. Moule, 98, British theologian and priest.
Eugene Saenger, 90, American radiologist and university professor.
Oswald Mathias Ungers, 81, German architect, pneumonia.

References 

2007-09
 09